Penstemon papillatus is a species of penstemon known by the common name Inyo beardtongue.

The plant is endemic to California, where it is known only from the eastern Sierra Nevada and slopes to the east. It grows in rocky woodland and forest habitat types.

Description
Penstemon papillatus is a gray-green, hairy perennial herb growing up to about 40 centimeters tall, becoming woody toward the base. The paired leaves are roughly oval in shape and fused about the stem.

The glandular inflorescence bears purple-blue flowers up to 3 centimeters long. The mouth of the flower is mostly hairless except for the yellow-haired staminode.

External links
Jepson Manual Treatment of Penstemon papillatus
Penstemon papillatus — U.C. Photo gallery

papillatus
Endemic flora of California
Flora of the Sierra Nevada (United States)
Natural history of Inyo County, California
Natural history of Mono County, California
Flora without expected TNC conservation status